Emory Parnell (December 29, 1892 – June 22, 1979) was an American vaudeville performer and actor who appeared in over 250 films in his 36-year career.

Early years
Born in St. Paul, Minnesota, Parnell trained as a musician at Morningside College, a Methodist institution in Sioux City, Iowa.

He spent eight months in the Arctic in 1929, looking for gold in that area's wastelands. He also worked as a telegrapher.

Music
Parnell spent his early years as a concert violinist. He performed on the Chautauqua and Lyceum circuits until 1930, when he relocated to Detroit, Michigan, to narrate and act in commercial and industrial films. A 1923 newspaper article described an upcoming Lyceum performance of "Emory Parnell, the one man band," saying that Parnell "plays an accordion, the snare drum and base [sic] drum, all at the same time."

During part of the Chautauqua years, Parnell had a family act that included his wife. In 1970, she recalled, "[w]e covered every state as well as Canada, Alaska and New Zealand." The Parnells resumed the act during the Korean War, doing "three to six programs a week in Army camps."

Film
Seeking better opportunities in Hollywood, Parnell and his wife moved to Los Angeles, California, where, helped by his red-faced Irish look of frustration, he immediately began to appear in films in roles such as policemen, doormen, landlords, and small town businessmen. One of his first films was Doctor Rhythm (1938).

Although his appearances were often in "B" films, such as the Ma and Pa Kettle series, he also performed in "A" films, including portraying a Paramount studio executive who sang about avoiding libel suits to open 1941's Louisiana Purchase. Parnell was also part of writer-director Preston Sturges' unofficial "stock company" of character actors in the 1940s, appearing in five of Sturges's films, including The Miracle of Morgan's Creek, where he played the crooked banker, "Mr. Tuerck", the chief antagonist of William Demarest's "Constable Kockenlocker". He also appeared as grumpy socialite Ajax Bullion in the Three Stooges short subject All the World's a Stooge.

Radio
In the late 1930s, Parnell was a member of the cast of Grouch Club on NBC.

Stage
In May 1949, Parnell appeared on Broadway for the first and only time, in the play Mr. Adam, which ran for only five performances.

Television

In the 1950s, Parnell began to appear on television in dramatic shows and situation comedies in roles similar to those that he had played in films.  He portrayed William Bendix's factory foreman, Hank Hawkins, on The Life of Riley, and Bill Anders on five episodes of the ABC/Warner Brothers western series, Maverick.

He appeared on the ABC/WB series, Conflict and The Alaskans, with Roger Moore, and a related NBC series, Klondike, with James Coburn and Ralph Taeger. In 1958, he appeared as fire chief “Sam Carter” in the TV series The Real McCoys (S1E34 “Volunteer Fire Department”), and in 1961, he appeared as "Ira Ponder" in the TV Western series Bat Masterson (S3E18 "The Prescott Campaign"). He appeared in an episode of the NBC family drama, National Velvet and in a 1964 episode of Perry Mason as an angry investor in "The Case of the Latent Lover". In 1966 he portrayed Sheriff Blake in "Jury at the Shady Rest" on Petticoat Junction and in "Pig in a Poke" on Green Acres.

Later years
As late as 1970, Parnell was traveling and entertaining with a family act—himself, his wife, and their grandson, Dennis Parnell.

Parnell's last acting appearance on television was in 1971 as a prospector on CBS's Gunsmoke. His last film role was as a bartender in the 1973 film, Girls on the Road. His final public appearance came in 1974, when he and his wife were interviewed by TV talk-show host Tom Snyder along with other residents of the Motion Picture Country Home and Hospital.

Personal life
Parnell was married to Effie Laird, an actress who appeared with him both in vaudeville and in films. They had two children together, one of whom, James Parnell, also became an actor. His son James died in 1961.

Parnell owned a 36-foot yacht and was a member of the United States Coast Guard Reserve.

Death
Parnell died of a heart attack in 1979 at age 86.

Selected filmography 

 Arson Gang Busters (1938) as Chief J.P. Riley
 Call of the Yukon (1938) as Swenson (uncredited)
 Doctor Rhythm (1938) as Sgt. Olson (uncredited)
 I Am the Law (1938) as Detective Brophy (uncredited)
 King of Alcatraz (1938) as Olaf
 The Mad Miss Manton (1938) as Doorman (uncredited)
 Girls on Probation (1938) as Officer Craig (uncredited)
 Illegal Traffic (1938) as Lieutenant (uncredited)
 Angels with Dirty Faces (1938) as Officer McMann (uncredited)
 Blondie (1938) as Police Desk Sergeant (uncredited)
 Sweethearts (1938) as Fire Inspector (uncredited)
 Pacific Liner (1939) as Olaf
 Off the Record (1939) as Policeman (uncredited)
 Idiot's Delight (1939) as Fifth Avenue Mounted Cop (uncredited)
 St. Louis Blues (1939) as Policeman White (uncredited)
 Twelve Crowded Hours (1939) as Doorkeeper (uncredited)
 Let Freedom Ring (1939) as Axel - 1st Swede (uncredited)
 You Can't Get Away with Murder (1939) as Second Detective (uncredited)
 Sudden Money (1939) as Cop (uncredited)
 The Lady and the Mob (1939) as Policeman Riley (uncredited)
 East Side of Heaven (1939) as Doorman (uncredited)
 Union Pacific (1939) as Foreman (uncredited)
 Unmarried (1939) as Cop (uncredited)
 The House of Fear (1939) as Policeman (uncredited)
 They Shall Have Music (1939) as Policeman in Rain (uncredited)
 The Spellbinder (1939) as Club 88 Doorman (uncredited)
 Winter Carnival (1939) as Williams - Editor (uncredited)
 I Stole a Million (1939) as Friendly Cop at Flower Shop (uncredited)
 The Star Maker (1939) as Mr. Olson
 The Day the Bookies Wept (1939) as Motor Cop (uncredited)
 At the Circus aka The Marx Brothers at the Circus (1939) as Ringmaster (uncredited)
 Sued for Libel (1939) as Jerome Walsh
 On Dress Parade (1939) as Paddy - Policeman (uncredited)
 Little Accident (1939) as Policeman (uncredited)
 The Roaring Twenties (1939) as Gangster (uncredited)
 One Hour to Live (1939) as Fats Monoham
 The Secret of Dr. Kildare (1939) as Policeman on Gaylor Ave.(uncredited)
 Invisible Stripes (1939) as Policeman Outside Bank (uncredited)
 Abe Lincoln in Illinois (1940) as Minor Role (uncredited)
 Young Tom Edison (1940) as Bob (uncredited)
 Blondie on a Budget (1940) as Policeman Dempsey (uncredited)
 If I Had My Way (1940) as Gustav Erickson (uncredited)
 Those Were the Days! (1940) as Jailer (uncredited)
 Out West with the Peppers (1940) as Ole
 The Great McGinty (1940) as Policeman at Soup Kitchen (uncredited)
 Stranger on the Third Floor (1940) as Detective (uncredited)
 Foreign Correspondent (1940) as Captain John Martin of "The Mohican"
 The Golden Fleecing (1940) as Featherway (uncredited)
 Hit Parade of 1941 (1940) (uncredited)
 North West Mounted Police (1940) as George Higgins (uncredited)
 The Devil's Pipeline (1940) as R. J. Adams
 A Night at Earl Carroll's (1940) as Policeman (uncredited)
 Babes on Broadway (1941) as Inspector Moriarity (uncredited)
 Dangerously They Live (1941) as John Dill (uncredited)
 Law of the Tropics (1941) as Bartender (uncredited)
 Mob Town (1941) as Captain Harrington - Police Chief (uncredited)
 Honky Tonk (1941) as Dr. Otis (uncredited)
 Nine Lives Are Not Enough (1941) as Lieutenant Buckley (uncredited)
 Manpower (1941) as Cully (uncredited)
 Blondie in Society (1941) as Chief of Police (uncredited)
 For Beauty's Sake (1941) as Police Lt. Doleman (uncredited)
 Thieves Fall Out (1941) as Policeman (uncredited)
 The Wagons Roll at Night (1941) as Doc (uncredited)
 Strange Alibi (1941) as Captain Alibi (uncredited)
 Washington Melodrama (1941) as Simpson (uncredited)
 The Sea Wolf (1941) as First Detective (uncredited)
 Golden Hoofs (1941) as Booth (uncredited)
 The Trial of Mary Dugan (1941) as John Dugan (uncredited)
 Western Union (1941) as Sheriff (uncredited)
 The Case of the Black Parrot (1941) as Simmonds
 So Ends Our Night (1941) as Weiss
 Mr. & Mrs. Smith (1941) as Conway (uncredited)
 The Monster and the Girl (1941) as Policeman in Alley (uncredited)
 A Shot in the Dark (1941) as Marsotti
 The Lady from Cheyenne (1941) as Crowley (uncredited)
 Blossoms in the Dust (1941) as Texas Senator (uncredited)
 Kiss the Boys Goodbye (1941) as Deputy (uncredited)
 Three Sons o' Guns (1941) as Delivery Man (uncredited)
 The Maltese Falcon (1941) as Mate of the La Paloma (uncredited)
 The Blonde from Singapore (1941) as Capt. Nelson
 Unholy Partners (1941) as Col. Mason
 Sullivan's Travels (1941) as Rail Yard Bull (uncredited)
 Johnny Eager (1941) as Policeman (uncredited)
 Louisiana Purchase (1941) as Sam Horowitz - Lawyer
 All Through the Night (1942) as Cop Outside Warehouse (uncredited)
 Cadets on Parade (1942) as Inspector Kennedy
 Obliging Young Lady (1942) as Motorcycle Policeman Behind Billboard (uncredited)
 Kings Row (1942) as Harley Davis (uncredited)
 The Remarkable Andrew (1942) as Policeman (uncredited)
 Reap the Wild Wind (1942) as Jailer (uncredited)
 Two Yanks in Trinidad (1942) as Police Chief (uncredited)
 Saboteur (1942) as Henry - Husband in Movie (uncredited)
 Larceny, Inc. (1942) as Police Officer O'Casey (uncredited)
 Syncopation (1942) as Judge (uncredited)
 They All Kissed the Bride (1942) as Mahoney
 Night in New Orleans (1942) as Jensen (uncredited)
 Little Tokyo, U.S.A. (1942) as Slavin (uncredited)
 The Pride of the Yankees (1942) as Chicago Policeman O'Doal (uncredited)
 Wings for the Eagle (1942) as Policeman
 Apache Trail (1942) as Mr. Walters (uncredited)
 The Major and the Minor (1942) as Conductor #2 (uncredited)
 Highways by Night (1942) as Police Sergeant Ransome
 I Married a Witch (1942) as Allen - Hotel Owner (uncredited)
 Once Upon a Honeymoon (1942) as Quisling (uncredited)
 Gentleman Jim (1942) as Dennis Simmons - Doorman (uncredited)
 Over My Dead Body (1942) as Police Capt. Grady
 Arabian Nights (1942) as Harem Sentry
 The Hard Way (1943) as Mac - Policeman at Hospital (uncredited)
 London Blackout Murders (1943) as Henryk Peterson (uncredited)
 The Outlaw (1943) as Dolan - Man Entering Saloon (uncredited)
 The Human Comedy (1943) as Policeman with Scared Ulysses (uncredited)
 Slightly Dangerous (1943) as Policeman of Newspaper Office (uncredited)
 Mission to Moscow (1943) as Uncaring Businessman (uncredited)
 It's a Great Life (1943) as Policeman (uncredited)
 Nazty Nuisance (1943) as Capt. Spense
 Du Barry Was a Lady (1943) as Gatekeeper (uncredited)
 Mr. Lucky (1943) as Dock Watchman (uncredited)
 Two Senoritas from Chicago (1943) as Rupert Shannon
 Young Ideas (1943) as Judge Canute J.Kelly
 Let's Face It (1943) as Colonel (uncredited)
 Dangerous Blondes (1943) as Officer McGuire (uncredited)
 The Unknown Guest (1943) as Sheriff Dave Larsen
 You're a Lucky Fellow, Mr. Smith as Conductor (uncredited)
 Government Girl (1943) as The Chief (uncredited)
 The Dancing Masters (1943) as Featherstone (uncredited)
 The Miracle of Morgan's Creek (1943) as Mr. Tuerck
 Address Unknown (1944) as Postman
 Seven Days Ashore (1944) as Captain Harvey (uncredited)
 Andy Hardy's Blonde Trouble (1944) as Train Conductor (uncredited)
 Once Upon a Time (1944) as Radio Cart Cop (uncredited)
 Gildersleeve's Ghost (1944) as Police Commissioner Haley
 A Night of Adventure (1944) as Judge
 Wilson (1944) as Chairman of Democratic Committee (uncredited)
 The Great Moment (1944) as Mr. Gruber (uncredited)
 The Falcon in Mexico (1944) as Winthrop 'Lucky Diamond' Hughes
 Casanova Brown (1944) as Frank
 Tall in the Saddle (1944) as Sheriff Jackson
 Heavenly Days (1944) as Detective (uncredited)
 The Falcon in Hollywood (1944) as Inspector McBride
 What a Blonde (1945) as McPherson, A1 Plumbing / Ration Board (uncredited)
 The Crime Doctor's Courage (1945) as Police Captain Birch
 Having Wonderful Crime (1945) as Desk Sergeant (uncredited)
 Two O'Clock Courage (1945) as Insp. Bill Brenner
 It's in the Bag! (1945) as Mr. Buddoo (uncredited)
 Zombies on Broadway (1945) as Ship's Captain (uncredited)
 Radio Stars on Parade (1945) as Chief Inspector (uncredited)
 Mama Loves Papa (1945) as O'Leary
 State Fair (1945) as Congressman James A. Goodheart (uncredited)
 Sing Your Way Home (1945) as Ship's Captain
 Colonel Effingham's Raid (1946) as Joe Alsobrook
 Deadline at Dawn (1946) as Captain Bender (uncredited)
 Riverboat Rhythm (1946) as Sheriff Martin
 The Falcon's Alibi (1946) as Metcaf
 Badman's Territory (1946) as Bitter Creek (uncredited)
 Strange Triangle (1946) as Barney Shaefer
 Deadline for Murder (1946) as Masseur
 Queen of Burlesque (1946) as Police Insp. Tom Crowley
 Gallant Journey (1946) as Car Driver (uncredited)
 Little Iodine (1946) as Mr. Bigdome
 The Show-Off (1946) as Mr. Appelton
 Abie's Irish Rose (1946) as Father John Whalen
 Calendar Girl (1947) as The Mayor 
 Suddenly, It's Spring (1947) as Elevator Passenger (uncredited)
 The Guilt of Janet Ames (1947) as Susie's Father (uncredited)
 Violence (1947) as True Dawson
 Gas House Kids Go West (1947) as Police Sgt. Casey
 Stork Bites Man (1947) as Alan Kimberly
 The Crime Doctor's Gamble (1947) as O'Reilly
 Summer Holiday (1948) as Dannville Beach Club Bartender (uncredited)
 Here Comes Trouble (1948) as Winfield 'Windy' Blake
 Song of Idaho (1948) as J. Chester Nottingham
 Mr. Blandings Builds His Dream House (1948) as Mr. PeDelford
 Assigned to Danger (1948) as Sheriff (uncredited)
 Blonde Ice (1948) as Police Capt. Bill Murdock
 The Babe Ruth Story (1948) as Saloon Keeper (scenes deleted)
 You Gotta Stay Happy (1948) as Bank Watchman
 Strike It Rich (1948) as Carlton
 Disaster (1948) as Father Mulvaney (uncredited)
 Words and Music (1948) as Mr. Feiner
 Rose of the Yukon (1949) as Tim McNab
 A Woman's Secret (1949) as Desk Sergeant
 Alaska Patrol (1949) as Capt. Jan Robart
 Hideout (1949) as Arnie Anderson
 Ma and Pa Kettle (1949) as Bill Reed
 The Beautiful Blonde from Bashful Bend (1949) as Mr. Hingleman
 Hellfire (1949) as Sheriff Duffy
 Massacre River (1949) as Sgt. Johanssen
 Unmasked (1950) as 'Pop' Swenson
 Key to the City (1950) as Council Chairman
 Beware of Blondie (1950) as Herb Woodley
 Rock Island Trail (1950) as Senator Wells
 Kill the Umpire (1950) as Schultz - Home Plate Umpire (uncredited)
 County Fair (1950) as Tim Brennan
 Chain Gang (1950) as Capt. Duncan
 To Please a Lady (1950) as Mr. Wendall
 Trail of Robin Hood (1950) as J. Corwin Aldridge
 Grounds for Marriage (1951) Cop taking Ina Back to Apartment (uncredited)
 Belle Le Grand (1951) as Marshal at Concert (uncredited)
 My True Story (1951) as Ed Praskins
 The Lemon Drop Kid (1951) as Man bumped into on street (uncredited)
 The Redhead and the Cowboy (1951) as Northern Sympathizer Barfly (uncredited)
 Ma and Pa Kettle Back on the Farm (1951) as Billy Reed
 Two of a Kind (1951) as First Deputy (uncredited) 
 Show Boat (1951) as Jake Green, the Trocadero nightclub manager (uncredited)
 Let's Go Navy! (1951) as Police Sgt. Mulloy
 All That I Have (1951) as Juror Barstow
 Honeychile (1951) as Mayor
 Golden Girl (1951) as McGuire (uncredited)
 Boots Malone (1952) as Evans (uncredited)
 Rancho Notorious (1952) as Sheriff #2
 Oklahoma Annie (1952) as Judge Byrnes
 The Fabulous Senorita (1952) as Dean Bradshaw
 Macao (1952) as Ship's Captain (uncredited)
 Gobs and Gals (1952) as Senator Prentice
 When in Rome (1952) as Ship's Captain
 And Now Tomorrow (1952)
 The Girl in White (1952) as Yardman (uncredited)
 Has Anybody Seen My Gal (1952) as Policeman Clancy (uncredited)
 Washington Story (1952) as Howard - INS Chief (uncredited)
 Ma and Pa Kettle at the Fair (1952) as Billy Reed
 Dreamboat (1952) as Used Car Salesman 'Crazy Sam' (uncredited)
 Lost in Alaska (1952) as Sherman
 The Lawless Breed (1953) as Bartender (uncredited)
 Confidentially Connie (1953) as Mr. Daveney (uncredited)
 Call Me Madam (1953) as Sen. Charlie Gallagher
 Fort Vengeance (1953) as Patrick Fitzgibbon
 The Girl Who Had Everything (1953) as Horse Auctioneer (uncredited)
 Safari Drums (1953) as Larry Conrad
 The Band Wagon (1953) as Man on Train (uncredited)
 Sweethearts on Parade (1953) as Mayor
 Here Come the Girls (1953) as Police Chief Garrity (uncredited)
 Shadows of Tombstone (1953) as Sheriff Webb (uncredited)
 Easy to Love (1953) as Mr. Huffnagel (uncredited)
 So You Want to Learn to Dance (1953) as George Bilvens
 The Long, Long Trailer (1954) as Policeman (uncredited) 
 The Battle of Rogue River (1954) as Sgt. McClain
 Ma and Pa Kettle at Home (1954) as Billy Reed
 The Rocket Man (1954) as Big Bill Watkins
 Pride of the Blue Grass (1954) as Mr. Casey
 Sabrina (1954) as Charles - Butler (uncredited)
 Jungle Gents (1954) as Police Capt. Daly (uncredited)
 The Looters (1955) as Joe Sr.
 The Road to Denver (1955) as Mr. Murdock (uncredited)
 You're Never Too Young (1955) as Train Conductor (uncredited)
 How to Be Very, Very Popular (1955) as Chief of Police
 Artists and Models (1955) as Mr. Kelly (uncredited)
 That Certain Feeling (1956) as Senator (uncredited)
 Pardners (1956) as Col. Hart (uncredited)
 The Young Guns (1956) as Padgett (uncredited)
 Hot Shots (1956) as B. L. Taylor (uncredited)
 The Delicate Delinquent (1957) as Sgt. Levitch (uncredited)
 The Notorious Mr. Monks (1958) as Sheriff Cobus Anders
 Man of the West (1958) as Henry (uncredited)
 The Hot Angel (1958) as Judd Pfeifer
 Alias Jesse James (1959) as Angel's Rest Sheriff (uncredited)
 This Earth Is Mine (1959) as Berke (uncredited)
 A Hole in the Head (1959) as Sheriff (uncredited)
 Ada (1961) as Security Guard (uncredited)
 The Two Little Bears (1961) as Grimshaw Wilkes
 The Bounty Killer (1965) as Sam - Bartender
 Git! (1965) as T. C. Knox
 Changes (1969) as Man Seated at Lunchcounter (uncredited)
 The Andromeda Strain (1971) as Pete 'Old Doughboy' Arnold (uncredited)
 Girls in the Road (1972) as Bartender (final film role)

References

External links

1892 births
1979 deaths
Male actors from Saint Paul, Minnesota
American male film actors
American male stage actors
American male television actors
Morningside University alumni
Male actors from Detroit
Male actors from Los Angeles
Vaudeville performers
20th-century American male actors